Viscount  was a Japanese diplomat.

Kurino was born in Fukuoka prefecture. He studied at Harvard University, and then worked in the Japanese Ministry of Foreign Affairs. He served as Japan's Envoy Extraordinary and Minister Plenipotentiary to the United States of America, an Envoy Extraordinary and Minister Plenipotentiary to Russia, and Japanese Ambassador to France.
Kurino died in Tokyo.

References

1851 births
1937 deaths
People from Fukuoka Prefecture
Japanese diplomats
Kazoku
Harvard University alumni